Juta Krulc (1913–2015) was a Yugoslav landscape gardener, architect and artist. She worked into very old age and became known for being the oldest active garden designer in Slovenia.

Early life 
Krulc was born in Radovljica during World War I. In 1937, she graduated from the Department of Architecture at the Technical Faculty in Ljubljana, along with fellow architect, Ivan Vurnik, whom she married.

Career 
Krulc later moved to eastern Yugoslavia and became associated with the architect Mihajlo Nesic. She developed interest in Slovenian flora and painted for the Phenological Atlas. Along with Dusan Ogrin, she was involved in the revival of the Volčji Potok Arboretum. By the end of the 1950s her work focused on planning gardens for bourgeois mansions, influenced by the likes of Carl Gustav Swensson, Vaclav Heinic, Cecil Ross Pinsent, Georg Potente, and Ilse Fischerauer.

Her most notable achievements include planning the Villa Tartini Park in Strunjan, the Ljubljana Forestry Institute, and designing the gardens of Brdo Castle estate.

In 2012, Krulc received a recognition award for her work in Ziri, where an exhibition of over 30 gardens and 300 drawing plans were displayed.

References

Landscape or garden designers
Yugoslav architects
1913 births
2015 deaths
People from Radovljica
Slovenian centenarians
Women centenarians
Women architects